Archana Panjabi  (born 31 May 1972) is a British actress. She has had various roles in both UK and US television including as Maya Roy in Life on Mars (2006–07), Nas Kamal in NBC crime drama Blindspot (2016–17, 2020), Kendra Malley in Global TV drama Departure (2019), and Kalinda Sharma in CBS Legal drama The Good Wife (2009–15). Her work in the latter earned her a Primetime Emmy Award in 2010 and an NAACP Image Award in 2012, as well as two further Emmy nominations, one Golden Globe nomination, and three Screen Actors Guild Award nominations shared with the cast. Panjabi is the first Asian actor to win a Primetime Emmy for acting. Additional notable roles include Meenah Khan in East Is East (1999), Pinky Bhamra in Bend It Like Beckham (2002), Yasmin Husseini in Yasmin (2004), and Asra Nomani in A Mighty Heart (2007).

Early life
Panjabi was born in Edgware, London, to Govind and Padma Panjabi, both Sindhi Hindu immigrants from India. Her ancestry belongs to Sindh, now in Pakistan; her parents settled in India after the Partition of India. She graduated from Brunel University with a degree in management studies in 1994. She is also classically trained in ballet.

Career
Panjabi has appeared in film and television, from early appearances in the 1999 comedy film East is East to the BBC television series Life on Mars. Her first Hollywood role, as a British diplomat, was in the Oscar-winning The Constant Gardener, released in 2005. One of her highest profile film roles was in the 2002 comedy release Bend It Like Beckham. Panjabi then landed the role of witty and wisecracking office colleague Gemma in the 2006 Ridley Scott-directed romantic comedy A Good Year, alongside Russell Crowe and Marion Cotillard.

Panjabi next appeared in 2007 with Angelina Jolie in the film adaptation of A Mighty Heart, a book by Mariane Pearl, wife of the journalist Daniel Pearl. Panjabi played the role of former Wall Street Journal reporter Asra Nomani. In 2008, she played the role of Chandra Dawkin in Traitor.

She provided the voices for several characters in the British children's television animation Postman Pat. She lent her voice to the video game Dead Space: Extraction. Panjabi appeared on the BBC Four World Cinema Award show in February 2008, arguing the merits of five international hits such as The Lives of Others and Pan's Labyrinth with Jonathan Ross and Christopher Eccleston. In 2009 she portrayed an MI5 agent in the French movie Espion(s), and in the same year she joined the cast of the new CBS television series The Good Wife as Kalinda Sharma, for which she won a Primetime Emmy Award. Panjabi is the first actor of Indian descent to win an Emmy award.

In 2010, she played Saamiya Nasir in the British comedy The Infidel. On 28 May 2012, she was cast as pathologist Tanya Reed Smith in BBC Two drama series The Fall. Panjabi appeared as Blaise in the BBC World Service radio series Westway. After leaving The Good Wife in 2015, she guest starred in Fox comedy series Brooklyn Nine-Nine. She joined the cast of Shetland series 3.

In 2016, it was announced that she will star in ABC anthology drama series The Jury as the show's protagonist, Kim Dempsey. She also joined the cast of NBC drama Blindspot.

In December 2017 Panjabi commented in The Daily Telegraph on the improvement for offers of parts for actors from ethnic groups "I think there's definitely been an acknowledgement of there being a lack of diversity...". In an interview with The Guardian in February 2018, subsequent to her The Good Wife success, Panjabi ruefully recalled "A US talent agent once told me an Indian woman could never have a career in Hollywood". She also starred as Reece Shearsmith's third love interest, in the ITV drama The Widower, first aired in August 2019. She started on TNT’s drama Snowpiercer in Season three in 2022.

In May 2021, Panjabi voiced Depa Billaba in the series premiere of Star Wars: The Bad Batch,

Philanthropy

Panjabi was appointed the first Pratham USA Ambassador, representing the largest educational movement in India. She is a celebrity participant in the Rotary International's "This Close" public service campaign to end polio. In support of women's rights, she has partnered with Amnesty International to head their Stop Violence Against Women campaign to change the "no recourse to public funds" rule that traps women in a cycle of violence. On 9 February 2011, Panjabi walked in The Heart Truth's Red Dress Collection Fashion Show to increase awareness of the danger of heart disease, the number one killer of women. The Harvard Foundation and Office for the Arts at Harvard University invited Panjabi to participate in their Artist in Residence Program in Cambridge, Massachusetts, to share her creative process as an actress.

Awards

Panjabi was awarded the Chopard Trophy at the Cannes Film Festival in 2007. She was nominated for three Primetime Emmy Awards for Best Supporting Actress in a Drama Series for The Good Wife, winning in 2010. She won an NAACP Image Award in 2011 for Outstanding Supporting Actress in a Drama Series for the same role. She was also nominated for three SAG Awards with her co-stars of The Good Wife for Outstanding Performance by an Ensemble in a Drama Series.

Personal life
Panjabi married Rajesh Nihalani, a bespoke tailor, at the age of 26.

Filmography

Film

Television

Television films

References

External links 

 
 
 
 
 

1972 births
20th-century English actresses
21st-century English actresses
Actresses from London
Alumni of Brunel University London
British actresses of Indian descent
British expatriate actresses in the United States
English expatriates in the United States
English film actresses
English Hindus
English people of Indian descent
English people of Sindhi descent
English television actresses
English voice actresses
Living people
Outstanding Performance by a Supporting Actress in a Drama Series Primetime Emmy Award winners
People from Edgware
Chopard Trophy for Female Revelation winners